James Southworth Parker (June 3, 1867 – December 19, 1933) was a United States Representative from New York.

Life
Born in Great Barrington, Berkshire County, Massachusetts, he attended the public schools and was graduated from Cornell University in 1887.  He taught at St. Paul's School in Concord, New Hampshire in 1887 and moved to Salem, Washington County, New York in 1888 and taught at St. Paul's School at Salem. He began farming in Salem in 1898.  He was also interested in breeding harness racing horses.

He was a member of the New York State Assembly (Washington Co.) in 1904, 1905, 1908, 1909, 1910, 1911 and 1912. There he was allied with the opponents of the policies of Charles Evans Hughes.

Parker was elected as a Republican to the Sixty-third and to the ten succeeding Congresses, holding office from March 4, 1913, until his death on December 19, 1933. While in the House, he was Chairman of the Committee on Interstate and Foreign Commerce during the Sixty-ninth through Seventy-first Congresses.

He and Senator Charles McNary of Oregon introduced a bill in 1930 to give mail contract subsidies for transoceanic trip to American dirigibles.

He was married twice: first in 1899 to Marian Williams, who died in 1923; second to Amy Glidden, two years after his first wife's death. He had no children. He died on December 19, 1933, in Washington, D.C., and was buried at the Evergreen Cemetery in Salem, NY.

See also
 List of United States Congress members who died in office (1900–49)

References

External links 
 

1867 births
1933 deaths
People from Great Barrington, Massachusetts
People from Salem, New York
Republican Party members of the New York State Assembly
Cornell University alumni
Republican Party members of the United States House of Representatives from New York (state)